The Lockheed WC-130 is a high-wing, medium-range aircraft used for weather reconnaissance missions by the United States Air Force. The aircraft is a modified version of the C-130 Hercules transport configured with specialized weather instrumentation including a dropsonde deployment/receiver system and crewed by a meteorologist for penetration of tropical cyclones and winter storms to obtain data on movement, size and intensity.

The USAF's Air Weather Service (AWS) received its first C-130 Hercules in 1962 to conduct air sampling missions in the wake of a resumption of atmospheric weapons testing by the Soviet Union in September 1961. The Air Force was then in the process of replacing its fleet of WB-50 weather reconnaissance aircraft with WB-47E jets but by 1965 the AWS had decided it would better served by the WC-130 in the manned weather reconnaissance role. Since that year the Air Force and Air Force Reserve have operated a total of 50 WC-130s in five variants. The WC-130J Weatherbird is the current weather data collection platform for the 53rd Weather Reconnaissance Squadron.

Only one WC-130 has been lost during operational missions, H-model 65-0965, on 12 October 1974, flying in Typhoon Bess northeast of The Philippines. A former weather recon aircraft, H-model 65-0968, was lost on 2 May 2018 while serving with the Puerto Rico Air National Guard on its final ferry flight to retirement.  Two WC-130B models were lost to crashes after being sold to international customers, and another operational WC-130B aircraft was destroyed on the ground by a hurricane.

Development
In 1954 the Air Weather Service (AWS) replaced its WB-29 Superfortresses as its primary weather reconnaissance platform with a fleet of WB-50Ds deployed in seven squadrons. Between 1956 and 1960 six WB-50 accidents resulted in the loss of an entire crew and caused the deaths of 66 crew members; metal fatigue and other structural problems with the type was to end its service by 1965. The C-130 Hercules was desired by the AWS as the best alternative but budgetary limitations prevented the procurement of new aircraft for the mission. Headquarters Air Force had always considered aerial weather reconnaissance an expendable luxury when budget cuts were necessary or when funds were needed for expensive programs. In 1958 its desire to field a large ICBM deterrent force resulted in the shutdown of two AWS squadrons, followed by three more in March 1960. The problems with the WB-50, brought to a head in May 1960 by fuel leaks that grounded the entire 66-plane fleet, accelerated the process, which scheduled a complete phaseout by 1963. AWS fought against the decision, however, and the proposed permanent shutdown of AWS's flying mission alarmed high-level operational commanders worldwide, including the admiral commanding the United States Pacific Command. The commander of the Strategic Air Command, General Thomas S. Power, recommended that the WB-50s be replaced by B-47s that were being phased out by SAC, and when Gen. Curtis E. LeMay gave his support for the proposal, modification of 34 WB-47Es in 1963 for the AWS was approved and the re-activation of three discontinued weather recon squadrons scheduled for 1962.

In the meantime a bilateral moratorium with the Soviet Union on the atmospheric testing of nuclear weapons was starting its third year when a suggestion was made that the classified air sampling program monitoring the moratorium and being conducted by at least five USAF commands be consolidated under a single manager and agency. AWS lobbied for the mission and submitted a plan in February 1961 naming itself the single manager. LeMay, now Air Force Chief of Staff, approved the plan on 31 August 1961; the next day the Soviet Union resumed nuclear testing. Headquarters Air Force authorized the acquisition of five new C-130Bs factory-configured for the sampling mission to be delivered in April 1962 when AWS would become the air sampling single-manager. These became the first weather-mission C-130 aircraft.

After the five C-130Bs became operational with AWS, conversions of six C-130Es followed in 1965 but as weather platforms. A dropsonde system was installed in all the C-130Bs and the designation of all C-130 weather variants was permanently changed to "WC-130" on 25 August 1965. Three WC-130As were created in Southeast Asia in 1967 and 11 more WC-130Bs were added in 1970 to replace the WB-47s, which had been abruptly retired from service in September 1969. The first of 15 WC-130Hs was converted in 1973 from rescue command and control aircraft (that had themselves been modified from C-130Es). Service life of some of these variants over-lapped as they operated with the 53rd, 54th, 55th and 56th Weather Reconnaissance Squadrons. The -E and -H models have had the greatest longevity in service, 28 and 32 years respectively. Of the seven original weather reconnaissance squadrons, four of which received the WC-130 at some point, only the 53d WRS remains active, now assigned to the Air Force Reserve Command (AFRC).

The WC-130J model, introduced in 1999, is currently the weather reconnaissance platform for the 53rd WRS, part of the 403rd Wing of the Air Force Reserve Command at Keesler AFB, Mississippi. Many of the WC-130s replaced in the weather reconnaissance mission were subsequently redistributed after de-modification to other AFRC and Air National Guard wings for use again in their original tactical airlift role or as training aircraft, while others were sold to foreign air forces.

Mission 
The WC-130 provides vital tropical cyclone forecasting information and is the primary weather data collector for the National Hurricane Center, supplemented by the National Oceanographic and Atmospheric Administration's WP-3D Orion. The most important function of these reconnaissance aircraft is to collect high-density, high-accuracy weather data from within the storm's environment. This includes penetration of the center or hurricane eye of the storm. This vital information is instantly relayed by satellite to the National Hurricane Center to aid in the accurate forecasting of hurricane movement and intensity.

Variants and operational history 
The Lockheed C-130 has been operated as a Weather Reconnaissance aircraft in the following sub-types:

WC-130B (1962–1973)
Five new C-130Bs factory-configured for air sampling were delivered to the 55th Weather Reconnaissance Squadron at McClellan Air Force Base, California, in 1962. After operational testing and evaluation, three were distributed to the 54th, 56th, and 57th WRS and the 55th deployed one of its remaining two to Eielson Air Force Base, Alaska. In 1965 all had dropsonde systems installed at the Warner Robins Air Materiel Area (WRAMA) and were transferred to the 53rd WRS at Ramey Air Force Base, Puerto Rico, for use in the Hurricane Hunter mission. The first of thousands of such missions for the just-designated WC-130 was flown on 27 August 1965 into the eye of Hurricane Betsy, the most destructive hurricane in recorded history to that time.

In the aftermath of Hurricane Camille in August 1969 and the simultaneous shutdown of the WB-47 program, funds were appropriated to fund Project Seek Cloud, an upgrade of tropical storm reconnaissance capability by an increase in C-130 platforms and an upgrade in meteorological equipment. 12 additional C-130B transports  were obtained from Pacific Air Forces and modified in 1970–1971 with the new equipment suite.  One was soon transferred to the National Oceanic and Atmospheric Administration (NOAA) but the other 11 went into military service, three to the 54th to replace the WC-130As and the rest to the 53rd, which had transferred four of its five original B-models to other squadrons after receiving Seek Cloud retrofits. Efforts to develop forward-looking and side-looking weather radars were unsuccessful. The second batch of C-130Bs were in service only a few years before all were de-modified and turned over to the reserve forces.

The WC-130Bs were powered by four Allison T56-A-7A turboprop engines rated at 4,050 horsepower, had a cruising speed of 350 KTAS, a radius of action of 1,200 miles with a payload of 25,000 lb, and a service ceiling of 30,000 feet.

WC-130E (1965–1993)
In 1965 the Air Force procured six E-model variants to replace six WB-47Es in the 54th Weather Reconnaissance Squadron at Anderson Air Force Base, Guam. Three veteran airlifters were transferred from the Tactical Air Command (TAC) and three obtained new. All were modified with the AMT-1 dropsonde system and assigned to the 54th WRS, where they remained until 1972. From then to 1987, when they were assigned permanently to the 53d WRS, the E-models were assigned to the operational demands of all the operational weather reconnaissance squadrons. In 1989 they were upgraded with the Improved Weather Reconnaissance System ("I-Wars") utilizing the Omega Navigation System previously installed in WC-130H model and remained in regular operational service until retired in 1993.

WC-130A (1967–1970)
Three C-130A transports were obtained from TAC in 1966 during the Vietnam War to conduct Operation Popeye, a rain-making operation in Southeast Asia. In early 1967 they were modified for an additional weather reconnaissance mission by installation of the AMT-1 dropsonde system. Two were based for the dual missions on a rotational basis at Udorn Royal Thai Air Force Base, Thailand, with a third at Anderson AFB for maintenance and crew changes. Missions were flown by crews of the 54th WRS and included synoptic weather reconnaissance to all areas of SEA. All three reverted to C-130A standard in 1971 after their replacement by upgraded models.

WC-130H (1973–2005)

With the drawdown of U.S. participation in the war in Southeast Asia, a number of extended-range HC-130H CROWN airborne controllers assigned to the Aerospace Rescue and Recovery Service (a sister agency of the Air Weather Service in the Military Airlift Command) became excess because of budgetary reductions. With Hurricane Camille still fresh in the minds of Congress and the American public and retention of the AWS flying mission still strong in MAC Headquarters, AWS proposed to Headquarters Air Force in March 1972 that its 16 WC-130Bs be replaced by a like number of the available HC-130Hs. The request was approved in December 1972 but altered a month later. AWS was ordered to retain three of the Bs and could give up the other 13 in return for 11 HC-130Hs. $4.5 million was budgeted for WRAMA to transfer the Seek Cloud equipment from the Bs to the newer Hs, and the changeover occurred between June 1973 and July 1974. Four additional HC-130Hs were converted in 1975.

A total of 15 HC-130H rescue Hercules were eventually modified with Seek Cloud equipment and designated WC-130H, replacing all 16 WC-130Bs in the weather reconnaissance squadrons. The WC-130H was equipped with the more powerful Allison T56-A-15 turboprop engines rated at 4,910 horsepower and had wing-mounted fuel tanks that provided an additional 2,720 gallons (10,300 L) of fuel, extending the WC-130H's radius of action at maximum cruise speed (230 KIAS, 350 KTAS) to 2,250 nautical miles.

A contract was awarded Tracor Aerospace on 29 September 1987 to build and install 20 IWRS suites but two days later the 54th WRS was inactivated, leaving only ten WC-130s in service, seven with the 53d WRS and three in the Air Force Reserve. Even so, the IWRS system went operational in the WC-130H in 1988 and remains standard equipment.

Manned weather reconnaissance continued to be reduced when AWS finally divested itself of its flying mission in 1991 by inactivating the 53d WRS and transferring both the mission and its few remaining aircraft assets to the Air Force Reserve Command (AFRC). But the devastation wrought by Hurricane Andrew in 1992 again demonstrated the need for "hurricane hunting" and state-of-the-art equipment to accomplish it, and the 53d was resurrected as a full-time unit of AFRC in 1993. The WC-130s were transferred back to it but the H-models were showing their age and between 1999 and 2005 all were replaced by the new, technologically-advanced J-variant.

WC-130J (1999–present)

The WC-130J was the first variant obtained new from the factory since 1965. Ten were procured and assigned to the 53d WRS, now the only manned weather reconnaissance unit in the Department of Defense. The new model encountered teething problems that delayed its Initial Operational Capability until just before the 2005 Atlantic hurricane season. Conversion of the Lockheed Martin C-130J Super Hercules greatly enhanced the capability and safety of the WC-130 in its penetration of tropical cyclones on critical "fix" missions.
 
The WC-130J carries a minimum crew of five: pilot/aircraft commander, co-pilot, combat systems officer, aerial reconnaissance weather officer and weather reconnaissance loadmaster. The 53d WRS maintains twenty air crews (ten full-time and ten part-time) to meet its capabilities obligations in support of requirements for the National Hurricane Operations Plan of five sorties per day from Keesler AFB and two from deployed locations. Weather data instrumentation and the dropsonde delivery and recording systems are mounted in the aircraft on removable pallets at the front end of the cargo compartment, giving the aircraft a standard cargo mission capability also.

An average weather reconnaissance mission lasts 11 hours and covers almost . The crew collects and reports weather data as often as every minute.

The Aerial Reconnaissance Weather Officer operates the computerized weather reconnaissance equipment, generates the "horizontal data" measurements (also known as "Recco"), and acts as flight director inside the storm environment. The weather officer also evaluates other meteorological conditions such as turbulence, icing, visibility, cloud types and amounts, and ocean surface winds. The ARWO uses the equipment to determine the storm's center and analyze atmospheric conditions such as pressure, temperature, dew point and wind speed to create a Vortex Data Message sent to the National Hurricane Center.

The dropsonde is equipped with a high frequency radio and other sensing devices and is released from the aircraft over water. As the instrument descends to the sea surface, it measures and relays to the aircraft a vertical atmospheric profile of the temperature, humidity and barometric pressure and wind data. The dropsonde is slowed and stabilized by a small parachute. Through use of the Advanced Vertical Atmospheric Profiling System (AVAPS), the Dropsonde System Operator generates the "vertical data" (also referred to as "Drops") needed by the NHC, receiving, analyzing and encoding the data for transmission by satellite.

Between May 2007 and February 2008, all ten WC-130J were equipped with the Stepped-Frequency Microwave Radiometer (SFMR or "Smurf"), which continuously measures the surface winds and rainfall rates below the aircraft, mounted in a radome on the right wing outboard of the number four engine.

The WC-130J provides data vital to tropical cyclone forecasting.

The information collected makes possible advance warning of hurricanes and increases the accuracy of hurricane predictions and warnings by as much as 30%. Collected data are relayed directly to the National Hurricane Center, in Miami, Fla., a Department of Commerce weather agency that tracks hurricanes and provides warning service in the Atlantic area.

Accidents and incidents

Swan 38 – On 12 October 1974, a newly modified WC-130H (65-0965) assigned to the United States Air Force's 54th Weather Reconnaissance Squadron and its six crew disappeared during Typhoon Bess. No trace of the aircraft or its crew has ever been found.

Specifications (WC-130J Weatherbird)

See also

References
Footnotes

Citations

Sources
 
Hurricane Hunter Weather Equipment. Air Force fact sheet, Inside 403rd Wing, retrieved 2015-10-12

External links

Whiskey-Charlie!, an unofficial history of the WC-130
Tech Report: Dropsonde, official USAF technology news video published June 24, 2015. Retrieved 2015-10-12

C-130, W
C-130, W
1960s United States military utility aircraft
Four-engined tractor aircraft
High-wing aircraft
Four-engined turboprop aircraft
Meteorological instrumentation and equipment
National Oceanic and Atmospheric Administration
WC-130